The Island of Sodor is a fictional island featured as the setting for The Railway Series books by the Rev. Wilbert Awdry (and his son Christopher), begun in 1945, and for the popular Thomas & Friends television series from 1984 to 2021, although the Television series depiction of the island is significantly different and is widely understood that the Railway series and the TV series are different canons. It is depicted as being located in the Irish Sea, between the Isle of Man and the English mainland near Barrow-in-Furness in Cumbria, with the real-life Walney Island depicted as a part  of Sodor.

Inspiration and creation
The need for consistency in the locations for The Railway Series necessitated the creation of a suitable location. Awdry required a setting for his books that would be within Great Britain, but would be sufficiently isolated from the rest of British Railways to allow him to do as he wished with the location.

Inspiration came on a visit to the Isle of Man, which forms the Diocese of Sodor and Man in 1950. Awdry noted that while there was an Isle of Man, there was no similar island of Sodor (the name derives from Old Norse , "southern isles", a term that referred to the Hebrides and islands along the west coast of Scotland). A large island would meet the criteria he required, giving him the isolation from changes to the British railway system while giving him somewhere that people could easily imagine.

Between them, Awdry and his younger brother George worked out Sodor's history, geography, industry and language ("Sudric"). Inspiration came from various sources. Dryaw was an anagram of Awdry. Elsbridge was named after Wilbert's parish of Elsworth in Cambridgeshire. Some place names were Sudric equivalents or near-equivalents of those in the real world (for instance, Skarloey was a rough Sudric equivalent of the Welsh Talyllyn: logh (Manx) = llyn (Welsh) = "lake"). By the time they had finished, they knew more about Sodor than would ever be used in The Railway Series stories.

Their abridged notes were published in 1987 in a book titled: The Island of Sodor: Its People, History and Railways (Republished with some minor modifications by Christopher Awdry in 1992 under the title: Sodor: Reading Between the lines)

Etymology
The bishop of the Isle of Man is known as Bishop of "Sodor and Man". The Sudreys became "Sodor", which was fossilised in the name of the Diocese, long after it ceased to have any authority over the Scottish Islands.

Thus there is no island of Sodor; rather, the fictional island takes its name from an archipelago.

Awdry was intrigued to find that although the Bishop had the title "Sodor and Man", he had only Man for his diocese. "Everybody knew that there was an Isle of Man, but we decided to 'discover' another island – the Island of Sodor – and so give the poor deprived Bishop the other half of his diocese!"  (Rev. W. Awdry) Hence Awdry sited Sodor in the Irish Sea, between the Isle of Man and Barrow-in-Furness in Lancashire (Barrow later became part of the new county of Cumbria during the 1974 re-organisation).

Language
The fictional native language of Sodor is "Sudric", a language similar to Manx.

A lot of the place names on Sodor are clearly based on Manx forms, but often the nouns are inverted to match English word order. Some of the locations have quasi-Manx names, e.g. Killdane, which comes from "Keeill-y-Deighan" (Church of the Devil), hills are called Knock and Cronk, while "Nagh Beurla", means "I speak no English", a distortion of the Manx. The names of some of the 'historical' characters – used in the background but not appearing in the stories – were taken from locations on the Isle of Man, such as Sir Crosby Marown (Crosby is a village in the parish of Marown) and Harold Regaby (Regaby is a tiny hamlet on the parish boundary between Andreas and Bride).

Below are some words and phrases, and place-names translated into English:

Geography
Sodor is usually shown as much larger than the Isle of Man. Its north-west coast is separated from the Isle of Man by a sea strait called the Sudrian Sea (Faarkey-y-Sudragh), four miles (6 km) wide. Its north-east edge overrides and replaces the real Walney Island.

The place names on Sodor are mostly a mixture of Manx and Norse. Its highest mountain is Culdee Fell, which was modelled on Snowdon: the ridge of Devil's Back copies the Clogwyn ridge on Snowdon. The summit is reached by the Culdee Fell Railway, which is based on the Snowdon Mountain Railway in Wales.

The capital and administrative centre of Sodor is the city of Suddery; however, Tidmouth has grown to be the largest town on the island.  One of the more famous settlements on Sodor is Ffarquhar, the terminus of Thomas the Tank Engine's Branch Line.

All of the other settlements on the island are described in Locations on the Island of Sodor, while the six railway lines from The Railway Series are described below.

Railways
The railways of Sodor include standard and narrow gauge railways, a rack railway and a 15-inch gauge railway. The first few stories concerned standard-gauge engines (including Thomas the Tank Engine). Stories set around the narrow gauge railways soon followed.

The standard-gauge railway system consists of a mainline and several branch lines. They are linked to and interoperable with each other and with the mainland system, so the standard-gauge engines can visit London (for example) under their own power. In the story Gordon Goes Foreign several of the engines recount their stories of working in London when they were younger, and later in the same story Gordon pulls a train of mainland rolling stock to London. In the story The Fat Controller's Engines several of the famous engines visit London, and run on the mainland permanent way to get there.

There are two narrow-gauge railways and a 15-inch gauge railway: the Skarloey Railway, in addition to the rack-and-pinion Culdee Fell mountain railway, and the 15-inch-gauge Arlesdale Railway, each isolated from the other.  Movements of rolling stock (particularly engines) to and from the narrow-gauge railways is achieved by transporting them on flatbeds on the standard-gauge system, for example, when Rheneas is sent away for repairs in a flashback in the story Skarloey Remembers and later returned in the story Gallant Old Engine.

Each of the narrow-gauge and 15-inch gauge railways links to the standard-gauge system at an interchange station:
 the Skarloey Railway at Crovan's Gate
 the Culdee Fell Railway at Kirk Machan
 the Arlesdale Railway at Arlesburgh West

Description of lines

 The North Western Railway is the main railway company featured in the books. It controls the mainline railway and many of the branch lines on the island and is often referred to as The Fat Controller's Railway.
 The Mainline runs from Barrow-in-Furness on the mainland, joining the island at Vicarstown and transversing the island to Tidmouth.  Its main traffic is the Wild Nor' Wester', an express train from Tidmouth to London, a stopping passenger service dubbed "The Local" and freight traffic.
 Thomas' Branch Line runs from Knapford to Ffarquhar. It is operated by Thomas's push-pull train and Daisy the diesel railcar. 8 trains a day are provided each way.
 Edward's Branch Line goes all the way to Brendam from Wellsworth.  It links the china-clay works at Brendam to the mainline. It is run by Edward, who manages passenger traffic and possibly more locomotives. At peak hours there is an extended commuter service, during which trains run all the way to Tidmouth.
 The Little Western, also known as Duck's Branch Line, runs along the coast from Tidmouth to Arlesburgh. It has an hourly service operated by Duck and Oliver with their GWR-style auto-trains.
 The Peel Godred Branch runs from Kildane to Peel Godred and connects with the Culdee Fell Railway. There are 8 trains both ways hauled by electric locomotives, being the only line on Sodor that is electrified. 4 of these trains, presumably the ones in peak hours, continue to Cronk. The line also serves the Aluminium Works at Peel Godred, and has to handle heavy freight traffic of bauxite and aluminium products. The line is technically a Light railway, which means trains on it are limited to 25 mph.
 Four other North Western Railway branch lines detailed on the maps of Sodor have not featured in The Railway Series. They run from:
 Vicarstown to Norramby, via Ballahoo. This line has hourly trains as well as a half-hourly suburban service at peak hours. The suburban trains are operated as a joint service between the NWR and The Other Railway (which was originally the London, Midland and Scottish Railway, later British Rail and currently Northern Trains.
 Kellsthorpe Road to Kirk Ronan
 The Arlesdale Railway (also known as Small Railway), a 15 inch gauge railway, takes waste from the mines in the hills to Arlesburgh where it could be distributed to the rest of the Island.  It also carries tourists.
 The Culdee Fell Railway, a narrow-gauge rack-and-pinion mountain railway, runs from the summit of Culdee Fell down to Kirk Machan where it links to the standard-gauge line from Kildane to Peel Godred.
 The Mid Sodor Railway, a narrow-gauge railway, closed in 1947.  It ran from Arlesburgh to King 'Orry's Bridge.  Part of its route is now on the 15-inch gauge Arlesdale Railway.
 The Other Railway refers to the nationalised British Railways company that ran the Railway System in the United Kingdom until 1997, and later simply the National Rail.
 The Skarloey Railway, a narrow-gauge railway, runs from Crovan's Gate up to Skarloey.

On-screen portrayal
The Island of Sodor in the Thomas & Friends television series differs significantly from that in the books. Wilbert and Christopher Awdry's notes have been largely overlooked. The television version of Sodor appears quite larger and has more industry. The connection to the British mainland was not acknowledged until the 2013 feature-length film special King of the Railway, which introduces "The Vicarstown Rolling Bridge", connecting Sodor to mainland Britain.

In the 2000 film Thomas and the Magic Railroad, the Island was portrayed vastly differently not only to the Railway Series but also to the television series. Sodor was a magical land that was supported by a magical railway line called "The Magic Railroad". Without the Magic Railroad, the island would vanish off the face of the Earth. In the film, one could only travel to Sodor via The Magic Railroad or gold dust. This means the only way Diesel 10 and Splodge (Splatter and Dodge) could have arrived on Sodor is via boat.

Notes

See also

United Kingdom
Irish Sea
Walney Channel

References

Further reading
 Timpson, Trevor (4 July 2011). "Where is Sodor, home of Thomas the Tank Engine?". BBC News website. Retrieved on 4 July 2011.

External links
 The Mapping of Sodor

Fictional elements introduced in 1945
United Kingdom in fiction
England in fiction
Cumbria in fiction
Fictional islands
Fictional populated places in England
Islands of Furness
Thomas & Friends locations
Manx language